Litostroj is a Slovenian heavy machinery manufacturer based in Ljubljana. Its products include mainly water turbines for hydroelectric powerplants. Most of the production is exported. It provided around 8000 MW of installed power worldwide. Around 150 of them are pumped storage. It has also designed around 1200 large cranes. They also manufacture forging and pressing machines.

The structure for the plant was built using forced labor by political prisoners from camps set up immediately after the Second World War.

Litostroj Street in Ljubljana is named after the company.

References

External links 
 Litostroj Official page 
 Litostroj-pts 
 Litostroj Power

Slovenian brands
Engineering companies of Slovenia
Companies based in Ljubljana
Manufacturing companies established in 1946
1946 establishments in Yugoslavia